Minas is a department located in the north of Neuquén Province, Argentina.

Geography
The Department shares borders with Chos Malal Department at the East, Ñorquín Department at the south and Chile at east and northeast.

Departments of Neuquén Province